Dean T. Kashiwagi (born 27 October 1952) is a professor at Arizona State University and a specialist in best value procurement, the originator of a system called "PIPS."

Biography 

Kashiwagi was born on October 27, 1952 to Shizuo and Midori Kashiwagi. His father, Shizuo, was a second generation Japanese-American who graduated from the University of Hawaii with a Bachelor of Science in Civil Engineering and became a civil and structural engineer for the city and county of Honolulu. His mother was an entrepreneur with a Bachelor of Science degree from the University of Hawaii. Dean was the youngest of three children.

Kashiwagi   received   an undergraduate degree in civil engineering, followed by a  master's degree in 1983, and   a PhD in 1991e both in industrial engineering.

He served in the United States Air Force for 14 years after serving a church mission in Japan and attending college. While in college, Kashiwagi was a member of ROTC. After he received his undergraduate degree, Kashiwagi moved to Holloman Air Force Base in New Mexico where he became the JOC president.  During this time, Kashiwagi was sent to Arizona State University to acquire his PhD. In 1992, Kashiwagi retired from the air force and began teaching at Arizona State University.

Academic work 

He   developed the ideas of Information Measurement Theory and the Kashiwagi Solution Model; applying his theories to businesses, he developed a modified  theory called the Performance Information Procurement System. With this model, Kashiwagi started the Performance Based Research Group at Arizona State University.

References 

Living people
1952 births